John Nesbitt (1910–1960) was an American radio, film and TV narrator.

John Nesbitt may also refer to:
 
John Nesbitt (MP) (1745–1817), English Member of Parliament for Winchelsea and Bodmin
John Nesbitt (1900–1935), American jazz trumpeter, composer and arranger with Don Redman
John W. Nesbitt (born 1939), American Byzantine historian, wrote about Alexander of Cyprus
John D. Nesbitt (born 1948), American Western writer and educator

See also
Nesbitt (surname)